Ricardo Nuno Pereira Dionísio (born 4 December 1982) is a Portuguese football coach, currently the assistant manager of Brazilian club Bahia.

Managerial career
Dionísio began his professional career in the under-13 seven-a-side football side of Sport Alenquer e Benfica. He later worked in the youth sides of Benfica and Real Massamá before becoming a fitness coach at Monsanto in 2009.

Dionísio continued to work as a fitness coach in the following years, working under João Alves at Swiss side Servette, and later with José Peseiro at Al Wahda, Al Ahly, Porto and Braga. He then worked under the same capacity with Oscar Londono at Stade Nyonnais during the 2017–18 season, before rejoining Peseiro's staff at Sporting CP in 2018.

Dionísio became a football manager with Stade Nyonnais in 2019, and signed a contract with FC Sion in the Swiss Super League on 1 January 2020, mainly as a caretaker. His spell ended on 1 June, as he was replaced by Paolo Tramezzani.

In 2021, Dionísio joined Renato Paiva's staff at Independiente del Valle in Ecuador, and followed him to Mexico's León and Brazil's Bahia, the latter one as his assistant.

References

External links
FDB Profile

1982 births
Living people
Portuguese football managers
FC Stade Nyonnais managers
FC Sion managers
Portuguese expatriate football managers
Expatriate football managers in Switzerland
Portuguese expatriate sportspeople in Switzerland
Sportspeople from Lisbon District
Portuguese expatriate sportspeople in the United Arab Emirates
Portuguese expatriate sportspeople in Egypt
Portuguese expatriate sportspeople in Ecuador
Portuguese expatriate sportspeople in Mexico
Portuguese expatriate sportspeople in Brazil